Les Rosiers-sur-Loire is a former commune in the Maine-et-Loire department in the Pays de la Loire Region in western France. On 1 January 2018, it was merged into the commune of Gennes-Val-de-Loire.

The Commune was called "Les Rosiers" until 1993, when it became "Les Rosiers-sur-Loire".

The village is in the heart of the Anjou, south-east of Angers and north-west of Saumur. Its territory, situated on the banks of the Loire is essentially rural.

As a Loire village, its history has sometimes been troubled, as it was during the Second World War.

See also
Communes of the Maine-et-Loire department

References

Rosierssurloire